The New South Wales Electoral Commission is a statutory agency with responsibility for the administration, organisation, and supervision of elections in New South Wales.  It reports to the NSW Department of Premier and Cabinet.

Responsibilities 
The NSW Electoral Commission is responsible for the administration, organisation and supervision of elections in New South Wales for state government, local government, industrial and Aboriginal organisations, as well as registered clubs and statutory bodies.  It also manages the enrolment of electors and prepares electoral rolls.

The Commission determines electoral boundaries using a distribution process, which provides for an approximate equal number of electors in each electoral district with a margin of allowance of plus or minus 10% of the average enrolment. The Electoral Commissioner, in conjunction with a Judge of the Supreme Court and the Surveyor-General, reviews and considers advice prior to determining electoral boundaries. Electoral boundaries are reviewed after every second election or more frequently, when required under legislation.

History 
Until October 2006, the Commission was known as the State Electoral Office.

The Commission was initially responsible for the administration of the Parliamentary Electorates and Elections Act 1912. The Commission currently administers the Electoral Act 2017.

In March 2022, the NSWEC announced that it would not use the iVote online voting system for the 2023 state election, following technical glitches during the 2021 NSW Local Government Elections.  Advocates for blind and low-vision people in Australia subsequently accused the Commission of unlawful discrimination over the removal of the accessible voting platform.

See also

Elections in Australia
List of New South Wales government agencies

References

External links
 

Electoral
Electoral commissions in Australia
Government agencies established in 2006
2006 establishments in Australia